Ihor Bendovskyi (born 6 October 1981) is a Ukrainian former professional footballer who played as a midfielder.

References

External links
Dynamo Dresden Profile

1981 births
Living people
Ukrainian footballers
Association football midfielders
FC Chornomorets Odesa players
Borussia Dortmund II players
Borussia Fulda players
SC Fortuna Köln players
Bayer 04 Leverkusen II players
Dynamo Dresden players
SV Wilhelmshaven players
Rot-Weiss Essen players
KFC Uerdingen 05 players
Ukrainian expatriate footballers
Expatriate footballers in Germany
Ukrainian expatriate sportspeople in Germany
Footballers from Odesa
21st-century Ukrainian people